The Bastard Fairies were an American musical group from Los Angeles, California, formed in 2005. They are described as an "internet phenomenon," becoming at one point the No. 18 Most Subscribed (All Time) Musicians and No. 31 Most Viewed (All Time) Musician on YouTube. They achieved a measure of fame for a non-musical reason, after releasing a promotional video that received media attention on Fox News. The band's debut album, Memento Mori, was released on April 10, 2007.

Band biography
The band's website describes the group as being composed of two members, singer/lyricist Yellow Thunder Woman and guitarist/songwriter Robin Davey. Yellow Thunder Woman was a Native American ("Yellow Thunder Woman" being the English translation of her birth name, Wakinyan Zi Win), while her bandmate Davey is a British expatriate from Great Cheverell, near Devizes, Wiltshire, formerly in The Davey Brothers with his brother Jesse. The Davey Brothers album 'Monkey Number 09' was released on AN Records, a label owned by Dave Stewart of Eurythmics. Robin Davey and Yellow Thunder Woman, with Dave Stewart as executive producer, created an award-winning documentary film called The Canary Effect, which "takes an in-depth look at the devastating effect that U.S. policies have had on the Indigenous people of America." The Canary Effect won 'The Stanley Kubrick Award For Bold and Innovative Film Making' at Michael Moore's Traverse City Film Festival in 2006, and 'Best Music Video' Award at The American Indian Motion Picture Awards in 2006.

The band recorded their album Memento Mori "on a Mac" and has released twelve of its songs for free on their website as a means of "spreading the word about their music"; the version in stores includes five additional tracks. A track from that album, "The Boy Next Door," was featured on The L Word, episode eleven of the third season.

In August 2021, Yellow Thunder Woman passed away at the age of 40.

Controversial video
The band released a promotional video entitled "The Coolest 8 Year Old In The World Talks About O'Reilly," featuring a young girl discussing a number of political, religious, and social issues. The video was featured on The O'Reilly Factor, whose host is mentioned in the title, and was described as "child abuse" and "emotional abuse" in a discussion between host Bill O'Reilly and lawyer/"child advocate" Wendy Murphy, who recommends shunning the child and her family. The band clarified the content of the video on the video's YouTube page:

As of September 11, 2007, the video has received more than 1.6 million views and holds several honors on YouTube, including a ranking as the No. 10 all-time most-discussed video for news and politics.

Discography
Albums:
Memento Mori (2007)

EPs:
Man Made Monster (2010)
The Jesus Song and Other Stocking Fillers (2010)

Singles:
A Venomous Tale (Alternate Version) (2010)
Dirty, Sexy, Kill, Kill (2010)

Songs:
 "Apple Pie" (from Memento Mori)
 "Bad Moon Rising" (Video Only)
 "The Boy Next Door" (from Memento Mori)
 "Brand New Key" (renamed "The Rollerskate Song" and recorded live with The Uncle Lincoln Ukulele Group)* (Video Only)
 "A Case Against Love" (from Memento Mori)
 "A Case Against Love (Live)" (from The Jesus Song and Other Stocking Fillers)
 "Dirty, Sexy, Kill, Kill" (from Man Made Monster)
 "Earth Died Screaming" (from Man Made Monster)
 "Everyone Has A Secret" (from Memento Mori)
 "Exoskeleton" (from Memento Mori)
 "Fait Accompli" (from Man Made Monster)
 "The Greatest Love Song" (from Memento Mori)
 "Guns And Dolls" (from Memento Mori)
 "Habitual Inmate" (from Memento Mori)
 "A Heathens Lament" (from Memento Mori)
 "I Find A Vein" (from The Jesus Song and Other Stocking Fillers)
 "The Jesus Song" (from The Jesus Song and Other Stocking Fillers)
 "Man Made Monster" (from Man Made Monster)
 "Maybe She Likes It" (from Memento Mori)
 "Memento Mori" (from Memento Mori)
 "Moribund" (from Memento Mori)
 "Ode To The Prostitute" (from Memento Mori)
 "The Road To No Where" (from The Jesus Song and Other Stocking Fillers)
 "Silly Games" (from Man Made Monster)
 "Ten Little Indians" (from Memento Mori)
 "Tool For Your Love" (from Man Made Monster)
 "A Venomous Tale" (from Memento Mori)
 "A Venomous Tale (Alternate Version)" (Single Only)
 "We're All Going To Hell" (from Memento Mori)
 "Whatever" (from Memento Mori)

References

External links
The Bastard Fairies official site
The Bastard Fairies on MySpace
Interview with Yellow Thunder Woman at WickedInfo.com

Indie rock musical groups from California
Musical groups from Los Angeles
Musical groups established in 2005